Crăciun is the Romanian word for Christmas.

Crăciun may also refer to:

People with the surname Crăciun
Cătălin Crăciun (born 1991), Romanian football player 
Constanţa Crăciun, a vice president of the State Council of Romania from 1965 to 1969

Gheorghe Crăciun (author) (1950–2007), a Romanian novelist translator, and literary theorist
Moise Crăciun (born 1927), a Romanian cross country skier who competed in the 1950s 
Niculae-Cornel Crăciun (born in 1925), a Romanian Nordic skier who competed in the 1950s

Geography
Crăciun, a village in Lingura Commune, Cantemir district, Moldova
Crăciuneasa River, a tributary of the Râul Mare in Romania
Crăciunelu de Jos, a commune located in Alba County, Romania
Crăciunești, a commune in Mureș County, Transylvania, Romania
Crăciun (river), a tributary of the Drăgan in Romania

See also 
 Korochun

Romanian-language surnames
Christmas in Romania